Riccardo Gaiola (born 1 April 1996) is an Italian footballer who plays for Cattolica San Marino.

Biography
Born in Padua, Veneto, Gaiola was a youth product of Lombard club Internazionale. He was a player of their under-15 football team in 2010–11 season. Gaiola left the reserve team in summer 2014, for Cesena. On 11 August 2015 Gaiola was signed by Lega Pro club Prato. The club also signed several players from Inter, such as fellow midfielder Gianmarco Gabbianelli on the same day.

On 2 August 2019, he joined Serie D club Cattolica San Marino.

References

External links
 

Italian footballers
Inter Milan players
A.C. Prato players
A.S.D. Victor San Marino players
Serie C players
Serie D players
Association football midfielders
Italy youth international footballers
Sportspeople from Padua
1996 births
Living people
Footballers from Veneto